The 2016 EBSA European Snooker Championships was an amateur snooker tournament that took place from 12 February to 21 February 2016 in Wrocław, Poland. It was the 25th edition of the EBSA European Snooker Championships and also doubles as a qualification event for the World Snooker Tour.

The tournament was won by 34th seed Jak Jones who defeated fellow countryman Jamie Clarke 7–4 in the final. This was Clarke's second consecutive loss in the European Championships final. As a result, Jones was given a two-year card on the professional World Snooker Tour for the 2016/2017 and 2017/2018 seasons.

Results

Round 1
Best of 7 frames

Round 2
Best of 7 frames

References

2016 in snooker
Snooker amateur tournaments
Sport in Wrocław
2016 in Polish sport
International sports competitions hosted by Poland
February 2016 sports events in Europe